Tommy L. Green (April 8, 1956 – September 25, 2015) was a professional basketball point guard who spent one season in the National Basketball Association (NBA) as a member of the New Orleans Jazz during the 1978–79 season. He was drafted by the Jazz from Southern University and A&M College during the second round (35 pick overall) in the 1978 NBA draft. In 1987, Green returned to Southern University first as an assistant coach then as the head coach from 1996 to 2001.

Green died on September 25, 2015 at the age of 59.

References

External links

1956 births
2015 deaths
American men's basketball coaches
American men's basketball players
Basketball coaches from Louisiana
Basketball players from Baton Rouge, Louisiana
College men's basketball head coaches in the United States
New Orleans Jazz draft picks
New Orleans Jazz players
Point guards
Southern Jaguars basketball coaches
Southern Jaguars basketball players
Sportspeople from Baton Rouge, Louisiana